Code B is the second solo studio album by German musician Bela B. It was released on 2 October 2009.

Track listing

"Der Wahrheit" is the 14th and final track on the album. The song is known by three names:
 On the album cover: "Der Wahrheit" (The truth; possibly genitive: Of the truth). The song title comes from the line Ich will euch von der Wahrheit erzählen (I want to tell you about the truth).
 The announcement on Bela B's website: "The Wahrheit" (The truth)
 The German normal feminine article for Wahrheit (truth): "Die Wahrheit" (The truth)

There is a hidden track before Rockula that can be heard by rewinding to -1:00. This track is a recording of Lee Hazlewood speaking about his collaboration with Bela B on Das erste Lied des Tages from the album Bingo.

Singles
2009: "Altes Arschloch Liebe"
2009: "Schwarz/Weiss"
2010: "Liebe und Benzin"
2010: "In diesem Leben" (feat. Chris Spedding)

Personnel
Bela B – vocals, drums, guitars, samples

Los Helmstedt:
Olsen Involtini – guitars, keyboards, samples, backup vocals
Wayne Jackson – guitars, glockenspiel, ukulele, pedal steel, samples, backup vocals
Holly Burnette – bass, double bass
Lula – backup vocals
Paule – backup vocals
Danny Young – narration ("Bobotanz")

Guests:
Chris Spedding – guitar ("In diesem Leben nicht", "Ninjababypowpow")
Marcel Eger – additional vocals ("Schwarz/Weiß")
Emmanuelle Seigner – additional vocals ("Liebe und Benzin")
Alessandro Alessandroni – additional vocals, various instruments ("Der Wahrheit")
Sisters Ramadani – chor voices ("Liebe und Benzin")
Christian Ketchmer – cello ("Dein Schlaflied")
Jerome Bugon – horns ("Liebe und Benzin")
Sascha Moser – edits
Lars Meier – violin

Sources 
Official homepage/music (archived)

2009 albums
Bela B. albums